“Paradise” is a 1933 essay by novelist James M. Cain published in the March edition of  H. L. Mencken’s  American Mercury. The non-fiction piece provides a first-hand portrait of Southern California during the Great Depression. Cain, an Easterner raised in Annapolis, Maryland, was a recent immigrant to the  West Coast. The article presents his impressions of the geography, climate, architecture, cuisine and character of the most first and second-generation residents of the greater Los Angeles area. Cain’s overall evaluation of the region and its prospects for the future are generally positive: “...when you come to consider the life that is encountered here, you have to admit that there is a great deal to be said for it.”

Critical Assessment

Journalist and satirist H. L Mencken, to whom Cain submitted the essay for consideration in January 1933, declared it “the first really good article on  depression era California that has ever been done.” The American Mercury cover for the March 1933 issue assured readers that “Paradise” disclosed “What Southern California Is Really Like.”
Slow to be recognized as one of Cain's outstanding journalistic efforts, the work was judged  a “masterpiece” by the New York Times’s Richard Thomson in 1937.

Los Angeles Times literary critic David L. Ulin notes that “Paradise” had “slipped between the cracks” and remains a largely unknown work among Cain's ouvere. Ulin wrties:

Biographer Roy Hoopes notes that Cain's “ruthlessly honest” evaluation of California concludes that the Golden state had a promising future primarily because the place had been "populated by a selective process that had occurred in no other state…California migration brought people who were attracted to the climate and the geography after they had achieved a certain measure of success at home. What impressed Cain is that almost everyone in California felt ‘some sort of destiny awaits this place’ and it was going to be fascinating to see what happened.”

Footnotes

Sources 
  Cain, James M. 1933. “Paradise”. American Mercury, March 1933. https://www.latimes.com/books/la-xpm-2012-jan-01-la-ca-cain-essay-20120101-story.html
 Hoopes, Roy. 1982. Cain. Holt, Reinhart and Winston. New York. 
 Ulin, David. 2012. James M. Cain’s ‘Paradise’ is Prescient. Los Angeles Times, January 1, 2012. https://www.latimes.com/books/la-ca-david-ulin-20120101-story.html

1933 essays
American essays
Great Depression in the United States
1933 in California